Subhanpur may refer to the following places in India:

 Subhanpur, Nawada, a village in Bihar
 Subhanpur, Kapurthala, a village in Punjab
 Subhanpur, Ranga Reddy, a village in Telangana
 Subhanpur, Kanpur Nagar, a village in Uttar Pradesh

See also 
 Subhanpura, an urban area in Vadodara, Gujarat